The 1982 Australian Endurance Championship was a CAMS sanctioned Australian motor racing championship for Group C Touring Cars. It was the second Australian Endurance Championship and the first to incorporate titles for both drivers and makes. The Drivers title was awarded to Allan Moffat and the Makes title to Nissan.

Schedule
The championship was contested over a five round series.

Classes
Cars competed in four engine capacity classes:
 Up to 1600cc
 1601 to 2000cc
 2001 to 3000cc
 3001 to 6000cc

Points system
Drivers points were awarded on a 9-6-4-3-2-1 basis for the six best placed cars in each class at each round.

Makes points were awarded for the six best placed cars in each class on a 9-6-4-3-2-1  basis, but only for the highest scoring car of each make, regardless of class, at each round.

Results

Drivers

Makes

Notes and references

Australian Endurance Championship
Australian Manufacturers' Championship
Endurance Championship